is a railway station on the Nippō Main Line operated by JR Kyushu in Usa, Ōita, Japan.

Lines

Layout 
The station, which is unstaffed, consists of two side platforms serving two tracks. There had once been a side and an island platform but the centre track has been removed, leaving two side platforms. The station building is a modern steel structure which serves only to house a waiting area and an automatic ticket vending machine. Access to the opposite side platform is by means of a footbridge.

Adjacent stations

History
The Hōshū Railway was acquired by the Kyushu Railway on 3 September 1901 and the Kyushu Railway was itself nationalised on 1 July 1907. Japanese Government Railways (JGR) designated the station as part of the Hōshū Main Line on 12 October 1909. On 15 December 1923, the station became part of the Nippō Main Line. With the privatization of Japanese National Railways (JNR), the successor of JGR, on 1 April 1987, the station came under the control of JR Kyushu.

The station became unstaffed in 2016.

Passenger statistics
In fiscal 2015, there were a total of 93,756 boarding passengers, giving a daily average of 257 passengers.

See also
List of railway stations in Japan

References

External links

  

Railway stations in Ōita Prefecture
Railway stations in Japan opened in 1897